Colpy is a hamlet in Aberdeenshire, Scotland situated  north of Insch.

External links

Colpy in the Gazetteer for Scotland.

Villages in Aberdeenshire